Georges Meyer (born 17 April 1914, date of death unknown) was a Swiss sprinter. He competed in the men's 4 × 100 metres relay at the 1936 Summer Olympics.

References

1914 births
Year of death missing
Athletes (track and field) at the 1936 Summer Olympics
Swiss male sprinters
Olympic athletes of Switzerland
Place of birth missing